Nones, also known as None ("Ninth"), the Ninth Hour, or the Midafternoon Prayer, is a fixed time of prayer of the Divine Office of almost all the traditional Christian liturgies.  It consists mainly of psalms and is said around 3 pm, about the ninth hour after dawn.

In the Roman Rite the Nones it is one of the so-called "little hours".

In the Oriental Orthodox Churches, such as the Coptic Orthodox Church, Ethiopian Orthodox Church and Indian Orthodox Church, it is one of the seven fixed prayer times to be recited by all Christians.

History

Origin 
According to an Ancient Greek and Roman custom, the day was, like the night, divided into four parts, each consisting of three hours. Among the ancients the hour of Nones was regarded as the close of the day's business and the time for the baths and supper. This division of the day was in vogue also among the Jews, from whom the Church borrowed it. In addition to Morning and Evening Prayer to accompany the sacrifices, there was prayer at the Third, Sixth and Ninth Hours of the day.

Early Church
The Apostles continued to frequent the Temple at the customary hours of prayer (Acts 3:1): "Now Peter and John went up into the temple at the ninth hour of prayer."

At an early date mystical reasons for the division of the day were sought. St. Cyprian sees in the hours of Terce, Sext and Nones, which come after a lapse of three hours, an allusion to the Trinity. He adds that these hours already consecrated to prayer under the Old Dispensation have been sanctified in the New Testament by great mysteries—Terce by the descent of the Holy Spirit on the Apostles; Sext by the prayers of St. Peter, the reception of the Gentiles into the Church, or yet again by the crucifixion of Christ; Nones by the death of Christ. St. Basil merely recalls that it was at the ninth hour that the Apostles Peter and John were wont to go to the Temple to pray. St. John Cassian, who adopts the Cyprian interpretation for Terce and Sext, sees in the Hour of Nones the descent of Christ into hell. But, as a rule, it is the death of Christ that is commemorated at the Hour of Nones.

The most ancient testimony refers to this custom of Terce, Sext, and Nones, for instance Tertullian, Clement of Alexandria, the Canons of Hippolytus, and even the Didache ("Teaching of the Apostles"). The Didache prescribed prayer thrice each day, without, however, fixing the hours. Clement of Alexandria and likewise Tertullian, as early as the end of the 2nd century, expressly mention the Canonical Hours of Terce, Sext, and Nones, as specially set apart for prayer. Tertullian says explicitly that we must always pray, and that there is no time prescribed for prayer; he adds, nevertheless: "As regards the time, there should be no lax observation of certain hours—I mean of those common hours which have long marked the divisions of the day, the third, the sixth, and the ninth, and which we may observe in Scripture to be more solemn than the rest."

Clement and Tertullian in these passages refer only to private prayer at these hours. The Canons of Hippolytus also speak of Terce, Sext, and Nones, as suitable hours for private prayer; however, on the two station days, Wednesday and Friday, when the faithful assembled in the church, and perhaps on Sundays, these hours were recited successively in public. In the 4th century there is evidence to show that the practice had become obligatory, at least for the monks.

The eighteenth canon of the Council of Laodicea (between 343 and 381) orders that the same prayers be always said at Nones and Vespers. It is likely that reference is made to famous litanies, in which prayer was offered for the catechumens, sinners, the faithful, and generally for all the wants of the Church. John Cassian states that the most common practice was to recite three psalms at each of the Hours of Terce, Sext, and None.

Since the 7th century 
Practices varied from monastery to monastery. At first some tried to do the entire Psalter (150 Psalms) each day, but eventually that was abandoned for a weekly cycle built around certain hours of the day. In the Rule of St. Benedict the four Little Hours of the day (Prime, Terce, Sext and Nones) were conceived on the same plan, the formulae alone varying.

The writers of the Middle Ages have sought other mystical explanations of the Hour of Nones. Amalarius of Metz (III, vi) explains at length how, like the sun which sinks on the horizon at the hour of Nones, man's spirit tends to lower itself also, he is more open to temptation, and it is the time the demon selects to try him. For the texts of the Fathers on this subject it will suffice to refer the reader to the above-mentioned work of Cardinal Bona (c. ix). The same writers do not fail to remark that the number nine was considered by the ancients an imperfect number, an incomplete number, ten being considered perfection and the complete number. Nine was also the number of mourning. Among the ancients the ninth day was a day of expiation and funeral service—, the origin doubtless of the novena for the dead. As for the ninth hour, some persons believe that it is the hour at which our first parents were driven from the Garden of Paradise. In conclusion, it is necessary to call attention to a practice which emphasized the Hour of Nones—it was the hour of fasting. At first, the hour of fasting was prolonged to Vespers, that is to say, food was taken only in the evening or at the end of the day. Mitigation of this rigorous practice was soon introduced. Tertullian's famous pamphlet  rails at length against the Psychics (i.e. the orthodox Christians) who end their fast on station days at the Hour of Nones, while he, Tertullian, claims that he is faithful to the ancient custom. The practice of breaking the fast at Nones caused that hour to be selected for Mass and Communion, which were the signs of the close of the day. The distinction between the rigorous fast, which was prolonged to Vespers, and the mitigated fast, ending at Nones, is met with in a large number of ancient documents (see Fasting).

In the Roman Liturgy the office of Nones is likewise constructed after the model of the Little Hours of the day; it is composed of the same elements as in the Rule of St. Benedict, with this difference: that instead of the three psalms (125-127), the three groups of eight verses from Psalm 118 are always recited. There is nothing else characteristic of this office in this liturgy. The hymn, which was added later, is the one already in use in the Benedictine Office—Rerum Deus tenax vigor. In the monastic rules prior to the 10th century certain variations are found. Thus in the Rule of Lerins, as in that of St. Caesarius, six psalms are recited at Nones, as at Terce and Sext, with antiphon, hymn and capitulum.

St. Aurelian follows the same tradition in his Rule , but he imposes twelve psalms at each hour on the monks. St. Columbanus, St. Fructuosus, and St. Isidore adopt the system of three psalms. In the 9th and 10th centuries we find some additions made to the Office of Nones, in particular litanies, collects, etc.

Current practice

Roman Rite
With the reforms of the Second Vatican Council the traditional one-week Psalter cycle became a four-week cycle. Furthermore, is only mandatory to pray one of the so-called "little hours" (Terce, Sext, and None). In the liturgy of the hours of some religious orders Sext and None are combined to form a "midday hour". However, bishops, priests and others, "who have received from the Church the mandate to celebrate the liturgy of the hours" are still expected to recite the full sequence of hours, as closely as possible to the traditional time of day.

Antiochene Rites

West Syriac Rite

Byzantine Rite

In the Eastern Orthodox and Greek Catholic Churches the office of the Ninth Hour is normally read by a single Reader and has very little variation in it. Three fixed psalms are read at the Third Hour: Psalms 83, 84, and 85 (LXX). The only variable portions for most of the year are the Troparia (either one or two) and Kontakion of the Day. The service ends with the Prayer of the Ninth Hour by Saint Basil the Great.

During Great Lent a number of changes in the office take place. On Monday through Thursday, after the three fixed psalms, the Reader says a kathisma from the Psalter. The Troparion of the Day is replaced by special Lenten hymns that are chanted with prostrations. Then a portion of the Ladder of Divine Ascent may be read. The Kontakion of the Day is replaced by special Lenten troparia. Near the end of the Hour, the Prayer of St. Ephraim is said, with prostrations.

During Holy Week, on Great Monday, Tuesday, and Wednesday, the services are similar to those during Great Lent, except that there is no kathisma, and instead of the normal Lenten hymns which replace the Kontakion, the Kontakion of the day (i.e., that day of Holy Week) is chanted. On Great Thursday and Saturday, the Little Hours are more like normal. On Great Friday, the Royal Hours are chanted.

During the Lesser Lenten seasons (Nativity Fast, Apostles' Fast and Dormition Fast) the Little Hours undergo changes similar to those during Great Lent, except the Lenten hymns are usually read instead of chanted, and there are no . In addition, on weekdays of the Lesser Fasts, an Inter-Hour may be read immediately after each Hour (at least on the first day of the fast). The Inter-Hours may also be read during Great Lent if there is to be no reading from the Ladder of Divine Ascent at the Little Hours. The Inter-Hours follow the same general outline as the Little Hours, except they are shorter.

Armenian Rite
In the Armenian Liturgy, the Ninth Hour commemorates both the Son of God and the death and surrender of [his] rational spirit.

There is no separate heading for this service as there is for the other services in the Book of Hours. Still, this is a distinct service because the concluding “Our Father” which ends every Armenian liturgy, including all of the liturgies of the hours, also occurs at the end of the Ninth Hour proper in analogy to the First, Third, and Sixth hours, and before this additional service.

This service may be called the  Service, the service of mealtime, which was taken at the end of the day at the conclusion of work, which would have been after the ninth hour.

One can compare this  service to the Typica service celebrated in churches belonging to the Slavic tradition within the Byzantine liturgical rite. Not all ancient manuscripts of the Armenian hours have this service, therefore it is unclear whether this service is a later importation from the Byzantine liturgy, with the words and sequence of the Armenian  substituted for those of the Byzantine Divine Liturgy.

Outline of the Service 
Introduction: “Blessed is our Lord Jesus Christ. Amen. Our Father...”; “Blessed is the Holy Father, true God. Amen.”

Psalm 51: “Have mercy on me...”; “Glory...Now and always...Amen.”; Hymn of the Ninth Hour: “The light of day suffered with you... (...)”; Exhortation: “At every hour this is my prayer...(...)”; Proclamation: “Again and again in peace...”; Prayer: “Blessing and Glory to the Father...Now and always...Amen.”

During the Great Fast: The Prayer of John Mandakouni “With a holy heart... (...)”; Proclamation: “That we may pass this hour...(...)”

Otherwise continue here:

Prayer: “Lord of hosts...(...)”

Psalm (Daniel 3:33-34): “Lord, do not forsake us...(...)”; Hymn of St. Nerses (Tone 3): “Accept, Lord, the request of the patriarch Abraham...(...)”; Proclamation: “Let us beseech our lifegiving savior, Christ,...(...)”; Prayer, “Having fallen down before you...(...)”; Prayer of Sarkawag Vardapet: “Remember, Lord your servants... (...)”; Prayer: “God, beneficent and full of mercy...(...)”

Psalm 116 “I loved, because the Lord heard...(...)”; Psalm 117 “Bless the Lord all nations...(...)”; “Glory to the Father...Now and always...Amen.”

On dominical feasts and the commemorations of martyrs: Hymn (varies according to the tone of the day)

Otherwise continue here:

Exhortation: “For the souls at rest...(...)”; Proclamation: “Again and again in peace...For the souls...(...)”; “Lord, have mercy” (thrice); Prayer: “Christ, Son of God,...(...)” (on fasting days, said thrice); “Blessed is our Lord Jesus Christ. Amen. Our Father...”

The  Service

Exhortation: “Our psalmody and our supplications...(...)”; “Amen.”

“Blessed is the kingdom of the Father...Now and always...Amen.”

Hymn of the Time of Entrance (varies for the tone, commemoration, and liturgical season)

Song of the Time of Entrance (varies)

Proclamation: “Again and again in peace...accept, vivify, and have mercy.”; “Blessing and glory to the Father...Now and ever...Amen.”

 Antiphon (varies)

 Hymn (varies)

Holy God (varies)

Proclamation: “Again and again...For the peace of the whole world...(...)”; Prayer: “For you are the merciful and philanthropic God...(...)”

 Psalm (varies)

Reading from the Apostles (varies)

 Canticle (varies)

Reading from the Prophets (varies)

Chasou Alleluia (varies)

Pre-Gospel sequence

Gospel (varies)

“Glory to you, Lord, our God.”

Nicean Symbol: “We believe in one God...”; “As for those who say...(...)”; “As for us, let us glorify...(...)

Proclamation: “Again and again...And again with faith...(...); Prayer: “Our Lord and savior...(...)”; “Peace be with all.”; “Let us bow down before God.”; Prayer: “By your peace...(...)”; “Blessed is our Lord Jesus Christ.”; “May the Lord God bless everyone. Amen.”; “Our Father...”

“One is Holy. One is Lord, Jesus Christ, to the glory of God the Father. Amen.”; “Blessed is the Holy Father, true God. Amen.”; “Blessed is the Holy Son, true God. Amen.”; “Blessed is the Holy Spirit, true God. Amen.”; “Holy Father, Holy Son, Holy Spirit.”

“Blessing and glory to the Father...Now and always...Amen.”; “Blessed be the name of the Lord now and forever.” (thrice); “Blessed is God. You are the fulfillment of the Law and the Prophets...”

“I shall bless the Lord at all times, at every hour his blessing upon my lips.”

“Be blessed by the grace of the Holy Spirit. Go in peace, and may the Lord be with you and with everyone. Amen.”

Alexandrian Rite
In the Coptic Orthodox Church, and Coptic Catholic Church, the Compline is prayed at 3 pm using the Agpeya breviary before retiring.

East Syriac Rite

See also 
 Canonical Hours

References

Further reading 
 "Divine Office", The Anglican Breviary

External links 
 Basil the Great's Prayer of the Ninth Hour Eastern Orthodox
 The General Instruction of the Liturgy of the Hours Federation of Diocesan Liturgical Commissions

Byzantine Rite
Little Hours
Armenian Apostolic Church